The unofficial South American Championships in Athletics were held in the Chilean capital, Santiago, during April 1946. The event, entitled "II Campeonato Sudamericano Extraordinario Barón Pierre de Coubertin", was held in celebration of the 50th anniversary of the modern Olympic Games.

Medal summary
Medal winners are published.

Men

Women

Medal table (unofficial)

References

External links
gbrathletics.com

U 1946
1946 in Chilean sport
1946 in athletics (track and field)
International athletics competitions hosted by Chile
1946 in South American sport